Orolu is a Local Government Area in Osun State, Nigeria. Its headquarters are in the town of Ifon (or Ifon Osun) at.

It has an area of 80 km and a population of 103,077 at the 2006 census.

The postal code of the area is 230.

References

Local Government Areas in Osun State